The seals of the Nguyễn dynasty can refer to a collection of seals (印篆, Ấn triện or 印章, Ấn chương) specifically made for the emperors of the Nguyễn dynasty (Hán tự: 寶璽朝阮 / 寶璽茹阮), who reigned over Vietnam between the years 1802 and 1945 (under French protection since 1883, as Annam and Tonkin), or to seals produced during this period in Vietnamese history in general (the latter are generally referred to in Vietnamese as 印信, ấn tín).

In its 143 years of existence, the government of the Nguyễn dynasty had created more than 100 imperial seals. These imperial seals were made of jade, bronze, silver, gold, ivory, and meteorite.

Imperial seals typically have inscriptions written in the ancient seal script, but by the later part of the Nguyễn dynasty period both Chữ Hán and Latin script were used for some scripts.

According to Dr. Phan Thanh Hải, Director of the Huế Monuments Conservation Centre, at the end of the Nguyễn dynasty period the Purple Forbidden City contained a total of 93 jade and gold seals of which 2 seals were from the Nguyễn lords period made under Lord Nguyễn Phúc Chu (1691–1725) in 1709, 12 during the reign of Emperor Gia Long (1802–1820), 15 during the reign of Emperor Minh Mạng (1820–1841), 10 during the reign of Emperor Thiệu Trị (1841–1847), 15 during the reign of Emperor Tự Đức (1847–1883), 1 during the reign of Emperor Kiến Phúc (1883–1884), 1 during the reign of Emperor Hàm Nghi (1884–1885), 5 during the reign of Emperor Đồng Khánh (1885–1889), 10 during the reign of Emperor Thành Thái (1889–1907), 12 during the reign of Emperor Khải Định (1916–1925), and 8 during the reign of Emperor Bảo Đại (1925–1945). Hải stated that as of 2016 that there were no more imperial seals left in the Nguyễn dynasty capital city of Huế with most being handed over to the government of the Democratic Republic of Vietnam by Bảo Đại following his abdication in 1945 mostly now being in the hands of the Vietnam National Museum of History in Hanoi.

Dr. Phan Thanh Hải further stated that no imperial seals were produced during the reigns of Emperors Dục Đức (1883), Hiệp Hòa (1883), and Duy Tân (1907–1916).

Overview 

The Nguyễn dynasty's seal are rich and diverse in types and had strict rules and laws that regulated their manipulation, management, and use. The common practice of using seals was clearly recorded in the book "Khâm định Đại Nam hội điển sự lệ" on how to use seals, how to place them, and on what kinds of documents, which was compiled by the Cabinet of the Nguyễn dynasty in the year Minh Mạng 3 (1822).

Seals in the Nguyễn dynasty were overseen by a pair of agencies referred to as the Office of Ministry Seals Management - Officers on Duty (印司 - 直處, Ấn ty - Trực xứ), this is a term that refers to two agencies which were established within each of the Six Ministries, these agencies were tasked with keeping track of the seals, files, and chapters of their ministry. On duty of the Office of Ministry Seals Management were the correspondents of each individual ministry that received and distributed documents and records of a government agency. These two agencies usually had a few dozen officers who would import documents from their ministry. Usually the name of the ministry is directly attached to the seal agency's name, for example "Office of Civil Affairs Ministry Seals Management - Civil Affairs Ministry Officers on Duty" (吏印司吏直處, Lại Ấn ty Lại Trực xứ).

Seals were also given to people after they received a noble title. For example, after Léon Louis Sogny received the title of "Baron of An Bình" (安平男) in the year Bảo Đại 14 (保大拾肆年, 1939) he was also given a golden seal and a  Kim Bài (金牌) with his noble title on it. The seal had the seal script inscription An Bình Nam chi ấn (安平男之印).

Terminology 

The various seals of the Nguyễn dynasty had different names based on their function, namely Bảo (寶), Tỷ (璽), Ấn (印), Chương (章), Ấn chương (印章), Kim bảo tỷ (金寶璽), Quan phòng (關防), Đồ ký (圖記), Kiềm ký (鈐記), Tín ký (信記), Ấn Ký (印記), Trưởng ký (長記), and Ký (記).

Since the Nguyễn dynasty period seals have a fairly uniform shape (with or without a handle), the uniform description of these seals in Vietnamese are:

 Thân ấn - The geometric block, or body, of the seal.
 Núm ấn - The handle for pressing the seal down on texts. In case the seal is shaped like a pyramid, there is no knob.
 Mặt ấn - Where the main content of the seal (symbol or word) is engraved, this area is usually in the face down position. The stamp surface is often used up to engrave letters or drawings.
 Lưng ấn - The face of the seal, where other information about the seal is engraved, usually in the supine position. In the case of the flat-head pyramid seal (ấn triện hình tháp đầu bằng), the flat head is the back.
 Hình ấn - A word used to indicate the impression of the seal on a text.

Seals of the Nguyễn lords 

The first known seal of the Nguyễn lords had the inscription Trấn thủ tướng quân chi ấn (鎮守將軍之印, "Seal of the guardian general") and is found on letters signed by the An Nam quốc thiên hạ thống đô nguyên soái Thụy quốc công (安南國天下統兵都元帥瑞國公). This seal is known to have been produced under Nguyễn Phúc Nguyên and was used on documents created when interacting with the Tokugawa shogunate (Edo period Japan). This is one of the few lost seals of the Nguyễn (alongside the Hoàng Đế chi bảo) and the little evidence of its existence is found on a document with this seal attached to it dated with the reign era of Emperor Lê Dụ Tông of Bắc Hà is kept at the Japanese archives in the Edo Castle, Tokyo.

In the year 1709 Nguyễn lord Nguyễn Phúc Chu ordered the creation of a golden seal, this seal was 108 by 108 by 63 millimeters in dimensions. It bears the inscription Đại Việt quốc Nguyễn Chúa vĩnh trấn chi bảo (大越國阮𪐴永鎮之寶, "Seal of the eternal government of the Nguyễn Lords of the kingdom of Great(er) Viêt"; Modern Vietnamese: Bảo của chúa Nguyễn nước Đại Việt trấn giữ lâu dài). This seal classifies Lord Nguyễn Phúc Chu as a mandarin of the 2nd military rank. While the Nguyễn lords were nominally sovereign for over a century at this point, they hadn't commissioned the creation of a national seal before 1709.

On the left side of the seal was the legend Kê bát thập kim, lục hốt tứ lạng tứ tiền tâm phân (80% pure gold, weighing 6 lingots, 4 and 4/10 and 3/100 tael (= 64,43 taels = 2364 g) ), while on the right side of the seal is the inscription Vĩnh Thịnh ngũ niên thập nhị nguyệt sơ lực nhật tạo (Created on the 6th day of the 12th month of the 5th year of the Vĩnh Thịnh era (or the year 1709 in the Gregorian calendar)). The reason why Nguyễn Phúc Chu decided to use the era name of Emperor Lê Dụ Tông was because the Nguyễn lords, who ruled over Inner Vietnam, were nominally the vassals of the Revival Lê dynasty (Later Lê dynasty) in Outer Vietnam and used their reign eras and titles as a sign of submission. Nine other characters were engraved on the back edge of the base of the seal Lại bộ Đồng Tri Qua Tuệ Thư giám tạo ("Qua Tuệ Thư, dignitary of the Ministry of Internal Affairs, in charge of the supervision of the works").

As another sign of submission, the seal features a large golden imperial guardian lion as its seal knob, a heraldic element and common Buddhist symbol, as opposed to an imperial dragon symbolising imperial power. The guardian lion appears with a grinning head, protruding eyes, a half-open mouth revealing two sharp fangs, a curly mane, and a bushy tail. The ball on which the male lion's paw rests is believed to contain his vital essence. For some, the ball exemplifies the triumph of the spirit over brute force. For Zen Buddhists, it represents the unsurpassable or total perfection, Perfect Truth, full knowledge of Dharma. Others see in this object the "wish-granting pearl", one of the "Eight Treasures" which symbolizes purity.

While Nguyễn Phúc Chu requested the Kangxi Emperor of the Qing dynasty to recognise the independence of the Nguyễn lords country, and was rejected, he kept using a seal with the inscription Tổng trấn Tướng quân chi ấn ("Seal of the governor-general") on documents and dating them with the Lê dynasty calendar. During the reign of Nguyễn Phúc Chu the Nguyễn would continue to refer to themselves as "Lords" (主, or alternatively 𪐴) as opposed to the Trịnh lords who already called themselves "Kings" (王) at this point in time.

While the Nguyễn lords were gifted a seal with the inscription Tổng trấn Tướng quân chi ấn by the Revival Lê dynasty before to use in communications between them and the imperial court, but in 1744 Nguyễn Phúc Khoát proclaimed himself a "King" (王, Vương) and started using a seal with the inscription Quốc Vương chi ấn (國王之印, "Seal of the King of the nation") instead.

The Đại Việt quốc Nguyễn Chúa vĩnh trấn chi bảo seal was lost and recovered several times during the many wars fought by the Nguyễn lords, including being lost in a river once when the Lordly Nguyễn army was in retreat.

The Đại Việt quốc Nguyễn Chúa vĩnh trấn chi bảo was seen as a precious family heirloom and was kept passed down the Nguyễn family long after the Nguyễn lords were ousted by the Tây Sơn dynasty and was later the imperial seal of the Nguyễn dynasty until the 1840s.

When Nguyễn Phúc Ánh declared himself King of the Revival Nguyễn Lords state in 1780 in Saigon, he used the Đại Việt quốc Nguyễn Chúa vĩnh trấn chi bảo seal and the Cảnh Hưng era date of the Revival Lê dynasty state to showcase his allegiance to the Lê when fighting the Tây Sơn.

The Đại Việt quốc Nguyễn Chúa vĩnh trấn chi bảo seal was used by Gia Long on a funeral prayer document for Pigneau de Béhaine now preserved in Paris.

Seals during the Nguyễn dynasty period

Imperial seals 

After becoming Emperor in 1802 with the establishment of the Nguyễn dynasty, Emperor Gia Long decided to continue using the Đại Việt quốc Nguyễn Chúa vĩnh trấn chi bảo seal. It was carefully kept in a box out of sight and, unlike the other imperial seals, kept in the Trung Hoà Palace, the sovereign's personal residence located in the Purple Forbidden City. The imperial seal was not presented to court until the enthronement of a new sovereign.

According to the historian Lê Văn Lan the Emperors of the Nguyễn Dynasty, like the earlier monarchs of Vietnam, all took their seals as the symbol of the supreme governmental power of both themselves and the monarchy as a whole. Besides the imperial seals that were used in government administration, there were also special seals carved that symbolise titles, which usually went with a golden book (or "Kim Sách"), specific seals for worship ceremonies (for dead Emperors), or special seals that were exclusively stamped on poems or paintings.

Because the Emperors of the Nguyễn dynasty were all personally very much involved in the affairs of the state they produced a large number of seals each for very specific functions and most could be handed over to their successors. These seals sometimes only represent the emperor himself as an individual, and sometimes they also act as representatives of the imperial court. From the content of the seals used by the Emperors privately, it can be seen that the numerous different seals of the Nguyễn Empire were used on different occasions.

In the third month of the year Bính Tý, or Gia Long 15 (1816), Emperor Gia Long instructed the court to create special clothes, hats, and seals for himself and the crown prince to denote independence from China. These regalia all depicted five-clawed dragons (蠪𠄼𤔻, rồng 5 móng), in Chinese symbolism (including Vietnamese symbolism) five-clawed dragons are symbols of an Emperor, while four-clawed dragons are seen as symbols or kings. To denote the high status of Emperor all monarchial robes, hats, and seals were adorned with five-clawed dragons and ordered the creation of new seals with five-clawed dragons as their seal knobs to showcase imperial legitimacy. Meanwhile, the wardrobes and other symbols of vassals and prices were adorned with four-clawed dragons symbolising their status as "kings".

During the reign of Gia Long seals were produced with the inscriptions Chế cáo chi bảo (制誥之寶), Quốc gia tín bảo (國家信寶), Mệnh đức chi bảo (命德之寶), Phong tặng chi bảo (封贈之寶), Sắc chính vạn dân chi bảo (敕正萬民之寶), Thảo tội an dân chi bảo (討罪安民之寶), Trị lịch minh thời chi bảo (治歷明時之寶), and Ngự tiền chi bảo (御前之寶).

During the reign of the Minh Mạng Emperor many kinds of seals were made from different materials, each for specific purposes.

Inscriptions used by previous dynasties were at times also re-used when producing new imperial seals. For example, an imperial seal with the inscription Sắc mệnh chi bảo (敕命之寶) was first created at the time of the Mongol invasions of Đại Việt and Champa during the reign of Trần Thái Tông of the Trần dynasty and was used to stamp documents ordering or declaring royal (or imperial) ordinances during the early days of the war. The Trần dynasty period Sắc mệnh chi bảo seal was made of wood, but later versions of the Sắc mệnh chi bảo were primarily made of silver and gold. Precious metal Sắc mệnh chi bảo seals were made during Later Lê, Mạc, Revival Lê, and Tây Sơn dynasties. Under Minh Mạng a Sắc mệnh chi bảo seal was made for the Nguyễn dynasty, this seal was used on imperial ordinances until 1945. Furthermore, the seals of the Nguyễn lords such as the Thủ tín thiên hạ văn vũ quyền hành (取信天下文武權行, "Win the trust of all under heaven, seal for military texts.") also remained in common use until the year Minh Mạng 9.

It wasn't until the year Minh Mạng (1822) that rules were laid out for how, when, and where seals had to be used on official documents.
Modern scholarship based on the books "Khâm định Đại Nam hội điển sự lệ" and "Minh Mệnh chính yếu" concluded that the first stamps of a document were reserved for the Thủ tín thiên hạ văn vũ quyền hành, Quốc gia tín bảo, Văn lý mật sát, Ngự tiền chi bảo. These imperial seals were all cast in either gold or silver and were considered to be national treasures. Gold seals were often prominently placed on the era dates to signify the importance of the Emperor and the official nature of the document. The Văn lý mật sát seal was used to enclose important words, corrections, and revisions of different versions, threads, chapters, and books. The role of this precaution was to re-verify the corrections, fixes, additions, and to avoid unlawful fabrication. Separate rules also existed for when a seal was allowed to be stamped with either red ink or black ink.

During the reign of Emperor Thiệu Trị, 2 large jade stones were found in the year Thiệu Trị 4 (1844), these two large jade stones were presented to the imperial court by the people and the Emperor commissioned two jade seals to be created from these stones, namely the Thần hàn chi tỷ (宸翰之璽) and the Đại Nam Hoàng Đế chi tỷ (大南皇帝之璽). 
 
Emperor Thiệu Trị commissioned a new imperial seal to replace the Đại Việt quốc Nguyễn Chúa vĩnh trấn chi bảo seal as the imperial seal in the year 1846, this seal had the inscription Đại Nam thụ thiên vĩnh mệnh truyền quốc tỷ (大南受天永命傳國璽, "The Great South has the eternal Mandate of Heaven, jade seal for the transmission of the legacy of the Empire"). The modern Vietnamese reading of the inscription is Ngọc Tỷ truyền quốc của nước Đại Nam, nhận mệnh lâu dài từ trời. The creation of the heirloom seal started in 1846 and was made within one year's time.

According to the historical records during the year of the Horse (năm Bính Ngọ), or the 6th year of Thiệu Trị's reign (1846), while some people were searching for gold and precious stones in Ngọc mountain, Hòa Điền District, Quảng Nam Province, they dug up a very large piece of jade that extremely brilliant and shiny. After their discovery they had offered to the Emperor. Upon receiving the large and rare jade the Thiệu Trị Emperor saw it as an auspicious omen and ordered a new seal to be carved from it. This became the Đại Nam thụ thiên vĩnh mệnh truyền quốc tỷ seal. After a year's worth of effort and talent, the engraver had finished making the seal and offered it to Thiệu Trị.

Upon receiving the heirloom seal Thiệu Trị immediately held a large Đại tự ceremony to confer that he had the Mandate of Heaven and prayed to have a long and prosperous reign. After the ceremony was completed the new heirloom seal was ordered to be stored in the Trung Hòa Palace in the Palace of Heavenly Purity (Cung Càn Thành) complex alongside the Đại Việt quốc Nguyễn Chúa vĩnh trấn chi bảo heirloom seal of the Nguyễn lords.

It had a handle in shape of a rolling dragon, it is 14.5 cm high, 13x12.7 wide, and 4.25 cm thick. It has the words meaning "Day 15, month 3 year Thiệu Trị 7" (紹治七年三月十五日, Thiệu Trị thất niên tam nguyệt thập ngũ nhật) carved into it. On the left side of the heirloom seal it is engraved with the Chinese characters "Đắc thượng cát lễ thành phụng chỉ cung tuyên" (得尚吉禮成奉旨恭鐫, Modern Vietnamese:  Được ngày lành lễ Đại tự đã làm xong phụng chỉ khắc). On the head of the dragon on the top of the seal, it has the words carved "To serve in Nam Giao (南郊) ceremony" (南郊大禮邸告, Nam Giao đại lễ để cáo; Modern Vietnamese: Để tế cáo Đại lễ Đàn Nam Giao). This heirloom seal is said to be the biggest and most valuable among the ones produced by the imperial family of the Nguyễn dynasty. The Đại Nam thụ thiên vĩnh mệnh truyền quốc tỷ was used for diplomatic decrees and it was protected by the dynasty as an extremely valuable treasure.

During the reign of the Tự Đức Emperor the Nguyễn dynasty lost the Cochinchina campaign against the joint Franco-Hispanic forces and were forced to pay indemnities. Because the national treasury did not have enough gold bullion to pay, Emperor Tự Đức had to recover some gold and silver treasures that were displayed in the palaces to pay the French and Spanish. In the year 1869, the Tự Đức Emperor had ordered the princes (hoàng thân and hoàng tử) princesses (công chúa) to return the seals and needles that the imperial court had previously given them. After that, the Tự Đức Emperor had "renovated" (reissued) their items in the form of bronze seals and needles. From this point only the Emperor and his direct offspring used golden seals, some members of the imperial family were allowed to use silver seals, while mandarins of all ranks from the highest to the District-level mandarins used bronze seals. At the commune-level, mandarins used wooden seals.

Under the Tự Đức Emperor a round ivory seal with the 12 character inscription Hoan phụng ngũ đại đồng đường nhất thống Thiệu Trị chi bảo (歡奉五大同堂一統紹治之寶) written in 4 lines was created. The seal knob of this ivory seal is shaped like a dragon holding a wish-granting pearl. This seal was used on documents that record the joys and pleasures of the Emperor and the imperial family.

Sometime after the abdication of the Hàm Nghi Emperor an octagonal version of the golden Ngự tiền chi bảo (御前之寶) seal was created, this seal was usually stamped with the two Chinese characters "khâm thử" to indicate that a grammatical or other kind of error was present in the text. Before the creation of this octagonal seal the Ngự tiền chi bảo was always oval in shape.

In 1886, under the reign of the Đồng Khánh Emperor, the Imperial Order of the Dragon of Annam was established, which featured a blue enamel with the design of a seal reading Đồng Khánh Hoàng Đế (同慶皇帝) in seal script.

Following the unexpected death of the Đồng Khánh Emperor a successor was chosen by the French and the court-mandarins in the form of Nguyễn Phúc Bửu Lân, Prince Quang Thái, who became the Thành Thái Emperor. The Directorate of Imperial Observatory declared 1 February as a most auspicious day for the enthronement. On 31 January 1889, according to rites, the young prince had made his lais to his ancestors in the Palace of Heavenly Purity and he then received the regalia of the Nguyễn dynasty. However, Thành Thái should also have received the jade heirloom seal known as the Ngọc-Bi on this day, but this seal was removed from the palace by Hàm Nghi during his flight from the capital and was subsequently lost in the mountains of the Quảng Bình Province.

During the reign of the Duy Tân Emperor a secret wooden seal with the inscription Tải Toả Võ Công (載纘武功, "Continue military works") was created for documents related to the Vietnamese independence movement against French occupation. Léon Sogny, director of security in Huế, wrote about it in a letter in which he claimed that the seal was discovered by the Khải Định Emperor. Furthermore, Sogny noted thay some of the seal script characters resemble those of a seal produced under Nguyễn Ánh (the future Gia Long Emperor) when he was fighting against the Tây Sơn Rebellion in an effort "to reconquer the Kingdom".

Until the reign of the Khải Định Emperor most jade, silver, golden seals as well as the kim sách and ngân sách were kept at the Palace of Heavenly Purity, these were all strictly confidential. Without the orders of the Emperor nobody was allowed to open or even touch the seals. Every year, just before Tết Nguyên Đán, the Emperor would order the mandarins to perform the Phất thức ceremony and open all the caskets and then inventorise the treasures inside of the Palace of Heavenly Purity. After opening the casket the Mandarins would wash each seal with fragrant water and then use a cashew cloth to dry it and return it to their original place.

During the Khải Định period imperial seals with inscriptions written in Traditional Chinese characters instead of seal script began to be carved.

The last imperial seal produced by the Nguyễn dynasty was the golden Hoàng thái tử bảo (皇太子寶, "Seal of the imperial crown prince.") seal, which was created in the year 1939 during the reign of the Bảo Đại Emperor. It had a weight of 63 taels (lạng).

Around 1942 archivist and autodidact Paul Boudet, who was director of the archives and libraries of French Indochina, was granted access to all palaces and libraries of the Nguyễn dynasty in the Forbidden City by the Bảo Đại Emperor. Bảo Đại allowed him to study and record all the treasures stored in the Palace of Heavenly Purity. Precious items were moved out of cabinets and boxes for him to read, take notes about, and take pictures of. According to Paul Boudet there were 46 gold and jade seals belonging to the Emperors and Empresses stored in the Palace of Heavenly Purity, as well as 26 Kim Sách. Paul Boudet published his research and findings in Les Archives des Empereurs d’Annam et l’histoire annamite (Hanoi, IDEO, 1942). According to a 2015 British Broadcasting Corporation Paris (BBC Paris) news article by Phạm Cao Phong, the 46 imperial seals Paul Boudet documented were made of gold, silver, gilded copper, and gilded silver and of these imperial seals 44 are now in the possession of the National Museum of Vietnamese History in Hanoi.

Bronze seals of government employees 

Bronze seals, known as chương, tín chương (until 1832), ấn, and quan phòng, among others, were seals made for government employees and government offices of all levels. Bronze seals were often created as a pair together with an additional small reserve seal called a dấu kiềm. The inscriptions of the dấu kiềm were identical to that of the main bronze seal. The seals of middle-level and low-level mandarins were called ký, kiềm ký and được and were mainly made of bronze or wood.

All bronze seals in the Nguyễn dynasty were cast by the Vũ Khố (arsenal).

Strict regulations existed for bronze government office seals that forbade their usage outside of official documents, unlike corporate and private seals which could be used without limitation. If someone used a government seal in a private setting it was considered to be a criminal offense. An exception was made for the day of the traditional opening ceremony after new year (Tết Nguyên Đán) where seals were stamped on an empty peace of paper, however, it was stipulated that after stamping these papers with a seal that they had to be burned. Another regulation stipulated that if the court would confiscate a seal or if a lost seal was found that it was to immediately be destroyed.

When signing documents the head of the department had to personally impress the office seal on the document and no subordinate was allowed to use the seal.

Quan phòng 

The Quan phòng (關防) type seal appeared from the Gia Long period until the Minh Mạng period.
The Quan phòng was usually stamped on the name of the signing party or at times at the "month" (月, nguyệt) part of the date present on a document. This type was primarily used for the internal affairs of various government offices, for example for use by the Court of Justice exclusively for internal affairs.

Quan phòng-type seals typically had the two Chinese characters Quan phòng inscribed into the end of their inscriptions. Gia Long awarded Quan phòng seals with to a number of a high rank officials during his reign. It was not until the year of Minh Mạng 13 (1832) with the change of the bureaucracy structure, the establishment of the province and the appointment of new officials such as the Tổng đốc, Tuần phủ, Lãnh binh, Etc. that the Chương-style seals completely replaced the Quan phòng for many levels of the Nguyễn bureaucracy.

It was stipulated in the year Minh Mạng 13 (1832) that Quan phòng-style bronze seals would be created for the government offices of Imperial Arsenal (Nhà kho Vũ khố), Imperial Household Department (phủ Nội Vụ), Merchant ship management department (quản lý tàu buôn), tào chính, đê chính, Capital City Department (đề đốc kinh thành), Provincial military leaders (lãnh binh các tỉnh), kinh tượng, Palace Guards (xứ thị vệ), the Imperial Academy (Quốc tử giám), học chính, the Principality of Muang Phuan (Bang biện phủ Trấn Ninh), Thái y viện, the Cabinet of the Nguyễn dynasty (sung biện nội các sự vụ), Water Affairs Office Management (thủy sư thống chế), phòng văn thư, tả hữu tham tri, the 6 Ministries, phó thần sách, 5 Armies, quản lý thương quyền, the main representative offices of the Six Ministries in Saigon and Hanoi (tào chính các tào của 6 bộ ở Gia Định và Bắc thành), học chính các dinh trấn, chánh quản cơ tứ dực thủy quân, Thuận Thành District Management (quản lý Thuận Thành), hùng cự ngũ kích, thị tượng các vệ, dũng thịnh hùng tượng, tri tâm tượng cơ, Regular Army Guards (an định kiện binh trung tượng), the Provincial Military Commander of Huế (đề đốc kinh thành), các nơi quan tân (bến sông, bến đò được đánh thuế hàng hóa), tỉnh hạt, the imperial warehouse (nhà kho), Provincial Military Lead (phó lãnh binh), an phủ sứ, the Provincial Military Commander (đề đốc), the Imperial Guard (thị vệ xứ), Etc. These Quan phòng-style bronze seals were cast in different sizes and weights and were accompanied a smaller ivory or bronze seal with the same inscription. These seals were mainly impressed on documents using black ink.

The government of the Nguyễn dynasty granted more Quan phòng-style bronze seals to its bureaucracy on more levels than the contemporary Qing dynasty.

Đồ ký 

According to historical records, the Đồ ký (圖記) type of seals had to be placed on filings, private papers, books, salary, and reports. During the Nguyễn dynasty period the Đồ ký type of seal was often found on documents used by ethnic minorities, often on documents using their own scripts.

The Đồ ký was usually stamped on the "month" (月, nguyệt) part of the date present on a document.

It was stipulated in the year Minh Mạng 13 (1832) that the Đồ ký-type seal was granted to mandarins in charge of a Phủ-level division, District-level mandarins, teachers, instructors, guard chiefs, heads of a Ty, and naval commanders.

Only the Đồ ký-type seals of guards and army units were allowed to be stamped using red ink, while the rest used black ink.

Kiềm ký 

The Kiềm ký (鈐記) seal type was used by low-level mandarins and military commanders in charge of estuaries, border gates, small boat fleets, passes, Etc. It was usually stamped on the "month" (月, nguyệt) part of the date present on a document. Another feature of some Kiềm ký type of seals is that many of these seals had inscriptions written in Traditional Chinese characters as opposed to seal script.

It was stipulated in the year Minh Mạng 13 (1832) that the Kiềm ký-type seal was granted to the government offices of các tấn, thủ, vịnh, sở, the guards of the Meridian Gate (thủ hộ Ngọ Môn), the guards of the Great Palace (thủ hộ cửa Đại cung), the departments of the Six Provinces of Southern Vietnam (sở Tuần ty 6 (lục) tỉnh Nam Kỳ), and Trấn Tây Thành (thành Trấn Tây, Cambodia under Nguyễn dynasty rule).

Only the Kiềm ký-type seals of guards and army units were allowed to be stamped using red ink, while the rest used black ink.

Trưởng ký 

The Trưởng ký (長記) type of seals was commonly used by the chiefs of cantons and communes. This is considered to be the mark of lowest-level of local mandarins. The Trưởng ký was usually placed next to or below the section with the mandarin's full name at the end of the text to confirm the authenticity and responsibility of the participating mandarin. By the end of the Nguyễn dynasty period Trưởng ký were typically rectangular with Traditional Chinese characters in the middle and Latin script (romanisations) on the outer area.

Tín ký 

The Tín ký (信記) refers to general seals that were created by or for mandarins of any rank. From the Gia Long period all mandarins were allowed to make their own seals as they wished. The Tín ký were free to be used as individual seals in the fields of religion, personal beliefs and convictions, culture, and commerce in the Nguyễn dynasty. It was used to the stamp the position of the name of the signing party akin to how a signature works.

By the year of Minh Mạng 7 (1826), there began to be specific rules made for the usage and creation of Tín ký seals. According to the Khâm định Đại Nam hội điển sự lệ a mandarin was allowed to make a custom square seal made of ivory or wood. This seal was engraved with the name of the mandarin. New standard sizes were also introduced during this period. But overall these new rules weren't intended to change how the Tín ký were used, though it did specify that they had to be stamped below the date of each document using the same ink as the text on the document.

In addition, the Tín ký was commonly affixed below or next to the text used to indicate the title of the person or their name. Usually Tín ký were used by local officials for regional documents and served to identify the mandarin signing the document to other regional (low-level) mandarins.

Military seals 

During the reign of Gia Long 5 bronze seals were created for the five heads of the five different armies of the Nguyễn dynasty (ngũ quân), namely the Trung quân chi ấn (中軍之印), Tiền quân chi ấn (前軍之印), Tả quân chi ấn (左軍之印), Hữu quân chi ấn (右軍之印), and the Hậu quân chi ấn (后軍之印). The seal knob of these seals feature a Vietnamese guardian lion.

Seal knobs 

Below are some of the seal knob shapes that are required for the following government positions or institutions of the Nguyễn dynasty:

After 1945

Transfer of the Nguyễn dynasty seals to the Democratic Republic of Vietnam and its symbolism 

Following his abdication in 1945, Emperor Bảo Đại handed over 800 kilograms of antiques, including seals, from the Forbidden City and other royal palaces to the revolutionary government of the Democratic Republic of Vietnam following its declaration of independence. As the capital city moved from Huế to Hanoi these antiques were stored at the Vietnam National Museum of History. At the time, only light and small items were selected to move to Hanoi, as heavy items, such as the throne, the Emperor's palanquin, stone-made screen of the Minh Mạng Emperor, etc. were left in the city of Huế.

As a part of his official abdication, Emperor Bảo Đại personally gave his regalia to representatives of the government of the Democratic Republic of Vietnam in ceremony. In this ceremony he handed over the Hoàng Đế chi bảo (皇帝之寶) seal and the jade-encrusted silver sword (An dân bảo kiếm, known as the "Sword of the State") to the Communist government. The passing of the ceremonial seal and sword had been seen as symbolically "passing the Mandate of Heaven over to the government of the Democratic Republic of Vietnam". Following the French counteroffensive during the First Indochina War the government of Democratic Republic of Vietnam publicly buried the seal and the Sword of the State.

Following the transfer of the treasures from the government of the Nguyễn dynasty to the Democratic Republic of Vietnam, an official named Nguyễn Lân commented to Chairman Hồ Chí Minh "In the opinion of many people, it is necessary to melt all the gold and silver taken over from the Nguyễn dynasty to increase the budget to serve the resistance." (Theo ý kiến của nhiều người, cần nấu chảy toàn bộ số vàng bạc tiếp quản từ triều Nguyễn để tăng ngân lượng phục vụ kháng chiến). In response Hồ Chí Minh asked: "If one day we unify the entire country, what evidence will exist to confirm that we have a tradition of several thousand years of civilisation?" (Nếu một ngày nào đó thống nhất đất nước, chúng ta lấy bằng chứng gì để khẳng định chúng ta có truyền thống mấy ngàn năm văn hiến?). This decision ensured the preservation of Nguyễn dynasty treasures into the present day.

According to a paper written by Brian Michael Jenkins of the RAND Corporation in March 1972 entitled "Why the North Vietnamese will keep fighting" that distributed by the National Technical Information Service, an agency of the United States Department of Commerce, because of the transfer of the ceremonial seal and sword in 1945 the North Vietnamese believed that  they were in possession of the Mandate of Heaven while the supposedly Republic of Vietnam did not it. So Jenkins argued that the North Vietnamese and the Việt Cộng believed that they would be victorious in the Vietnam War because it was "Heaven's will" as only the government with the Mandate of Heaven was the legitimate ruler of the Vietnamese people.

Brian Michael Jenkins wrote that the senior leadership of North Vietnam (the Democratic Republic of Vietnam) and the Workers' Party of Vietnam believed this, as many were the children of Nguyễn dynasty mandarins and were raised in a Confucian environment, rather than from the Proletariat. This is why, in his opinion, the Communists often acted more as Traditionalists than did the South Vietnamese.

Later Brian Michael Jenkins noted that regarding the Mandate of Heaven being transferred through the passing of the Hoàng Đế chi bảo seal and the Sword of the State presented a strong personal motivation for the Communist leadership to pursue victory over the Republic of Vietnam (South Vietnam) during the Vietnam War. In a later passage regarding the psychology of the Communist Vietnamese leadership Jenkins wrote:

This was cited as an important psychological reason why the Communists were so determined to keep on fighting and didn't give up during the Vietnam War when fighting the South Vietnamese and their allies (including the United States).

Seal of the Chief of State of Vietnam 

Following the establishment of the State of Vietnam, former Nguyễn dynasty Emperor Bảo Đại created a seal (Ấn triện) for his role as the new Chief of State of Vietnam. This seal was square in shape and had the inscription "Quốc-gia Việt-Nam - Đức Bảo Đại - Quốc-trưởng" written in Latin script and "保大國長" (top-to-bottom, right-to-left) in seal script.

Fate of the Hoàng Đế chi bảo seal 

After carefully looking for the regalia the French later dug up the sword, which had been broken into three pieces, and then handed these pieces over to the Empress Dowager Từ Cung (the mother of Emperor Bảo Đại) who likely handed it over to the concubine Mộng Điệp. The Hoàng Đế chi bảo seal remained buried and when Hanoi was given back to the North Vietnamese they dug the seal up and gave it to the National Museum of Vietnamese History. Later the Hoàng Đế chi bảo was stolen from the museum and it eventually ended up in the hands of concubine Mộng Điệp who intended to hand it, and the sword, back to Emperor Bảo Đại after he would return from France to Dalat. However, Bảo Đại ordered her to bring the regalia to France, where she gave it to Empress Nam Phương in 1953. In 1982 the Crown Prince Bảo Long handed the imperial seal back to his father, Bảo Đại. Until 2022, there has been no word as to the whereabouts of the Hoàng Đế chi bảo seal.

In 2022, French auction house Millon announced it would put the seal up for auction after Monique Baudot's death, but the auction was deferred as the Vietnamese government expressed its intention to repatriate the seal through negotiations to buy it back. On November 15, the Ministry of Culture, Sport and Tourism of Vietnam announced that the Vietnamese government successfully negotiated the return of Hoàng Đế chi bảo from Millon.

On February 13, 2023, a Vietnamese antique collector had successfully acquired the seal. After the new owner of the seal was announced, an official from Ministry of Culture, Sport and Tourism told that the Ministry would complete all procedures to repatriate the Hoàng Đế chi bảo back to Vietnam.

Fate of the Đại Nam thụ thiên vĩnh mệnh truyền quốc tỷ seal 

Following the end of the Nguyễn dynasty in 1945, regional director of Huế, Phạm Khắc Hòe, decided to move it among other treasures from city to Hanoi to present it to Ministry of Labour on 27 and 28 August 1945.

In response to the outbreak of the First Indochina War in December 1946 the Ministry of Labour decided to transfer its Nguyễn dynasty collections to be stored at the 5th Interzone (Liên khu 5) for safekeeping. After Việt Minh victory at the Battle of Điện Biên Phủ in 1954, the collection (including is seal) was brought to the Ministry of Finance for management. On December 17, 1959, the Ministry of Finance decided to hand over its Nguyễn dynasty collections (including the seal) to the Vietnam History Museum (now the National Museum of Vietnamese History) for storage.

In 1962 to ensure the security of the collection during the Vietnam War, the Vietnam History Museum sent this collection to the State Bank of Vietnam for safekeeping. It wasn't until the 1000th anniversary of Hanoi (Lễ kỷ niệm 1000 năm Thăng Long - Hà Nội) that the seal was put on public display.

In 2017 the Đại Nam thụ thiên vĩnh mệnh truyền quốc tỷ seal was among 24 things declared a National Treasure that year and was described by the National Museum of Vietnamese History as its most valuable possession within its Nguyễn dynasty collection.

Nguyễn dynasty period cultural heritage artifacts in private and foreign hands 

As a result of both the French conquest of the Nguyễn dynasty in 1883 and the August Revolution overthrowing the Nguyễn dynasty in 1945 many treasures of the Nguyễn Empire have fallen in the hands of both Vietnamese museums scattered throughout the country and private collectors all over the world. In recent years, Nguyễn dynasty treasures have been publicly traded at antique auctions in places like London, Paris, New York, Etc., or sold on commercial websites such as eBay or Spin. A large amount of golden treasures of both the Nguyễn dynasty and the earlier Nguyễn lords, including seals, were given by the Nguyễn to the French and Spanish governments to pay for the war reparations imposed on Vietnam following the Franco-Hispanic Cochinchina campaign, many of these treasures are now (as of 2009) kept in the Hotel de la Monnaie, Paris. Another example of a sacking of Huế happened on 5 July 1885 when the rebellious Hàm Nghi Emperor fled the city and the Forbidden City was sacked by the French who stole 228 diamonds, 266 jewels encrusted with diamonds, pearls, pearls, and 271 gold items from a single palace alone, though a number of these treasures were returned during the Duy Tân period.

Nguyễn dynasty seals in Vietnamese museums 

In the year 1962, to ensure the safety of the antiques of the Nguyễn dynasty, the National Museum of Vietnamese History had moved them to the warehouse of the State Bank of Vietnam. This collection included many unique items of the Nguyễn Emperors as well as the rest of the imperial family, such as the hats of the Emperors, golden books, gold and jade seals, the Emperor's swords, furthermore, the collection included various types of daily-use items of the Emperors, the worship items of the Nguyễn Dynasty, and many documents containing cultural value of the Nguyễn dynasty. The treasures were stored in corrugated iron boxes and then packed in wooden crates with a list of corresponding artifacts. The keys to the crates were kept by the museum. For nearly half a century, the collection was completely closed off to the public, and very few people knew of its existence.

In the year 2007, the State Bank of Vietnam handed over the entire collection of precious artifacts from its warehouses back to the National Museum of Vietnamese History, this collection included 85 imperial seals.  
 
In the year 2010 to celebrate 1000 years of Thăng Long - Hanoi the National Museum of Vietnamese History published a book with 85 imperial seals made of gold, silver, and jade entitled Kim ngọc bảo tỷ của Hoàng đế và vương hậu triều Nguyễn Việt Nam, "Seals of the emperors and empresses of the Nguyễn dynasty") and were then put on display at the museum for public viewing. Many articles, books, and publications introducing the Collection have been published such as Cổ ngọc Việt Nam (Ancient Vietnamese jade) and Bảo vật Hoàng cung triều Nguyễn (Imperial treasures of the Nguyễn Dynasty).

In 2015, a ministry-level scientific research project started entitled Giải mã minh văn trên các bảo vật triều Nguyễn lưu trữ tại Bảo tàng Lịch sử Quốc gia (Decoding the characters on the Nguyễn dynasty treasures stored at the National Museum of Vietnamese History) which also investigated and researched all the seals stored at the National Museum of Vietnamese History.

In 2015 the Sắc mệnh chi bảo (Sắc mệnh chi bửu) golden seal created under Minh Mạng was designated as a National Treasure, or Bảo vật Quốc gia. This was later followed with the Đại Việt quốc Nguyễn Chúa vĩnh trấn chi bảo seal also being declared a National Treasure in 2016, which was then put on display for the public in 2017.

As of 2016 no imperial seals were left in the former Nguyễn dynasty capital city of Huế. Although at times some imperial Nguyễn dynasty seals return to Huế for exhibitions, such as the "Dragons and Phượng hoàng on treasures of the Nguyễn Dynasty" (Rồng - phượng trên bảo vật triều Nguyễn) exhibition of 2018 which hosted over 80 different treasures and artifacts from the Nguyễn imperial court including the Hoan phụng ngũ đại đồng đường nhất thống Thiệu Trị chi bảo (歡奉五大同堂一統紹治之寶), Tự Đức thần hàn (嗣德宸翰), and Chính hậu chi bảo seals.

Types of imperial seals 

While seals in the Nguyễn dynasty made from bronze, silver, ceramics, ivory, Etc. were made for mandarins and other people throughout the Empire without much restrictions, the materials of jade and gold were exclusive to the Emperors and the imperial family.

Jade seals 

Jade seals, or ngọc tỷ (玉璽),  were a kind of seal made of different kinds of jade like emerald, white jade, or blue jade. Most jade seals produced under the reign of the Nguyễn dynasty were carved under the reigns of Emperors Minh Mạng and Tự Đức. Due to the fact that jade at the time was considered to be a rare material, there were less jade seals produced than metal ones (like gold seals). The oldest jade seals during the Nguyễn dynasty were likely produced during the Nguyễn lords period and had the inscriptions Phong cương vạn cổ and Vạn Thọ vô cương (Endless life).

Later studies on jade seals in the records of the Nguyễn dynasty period by the National Museum of Vietnamese History in Hanoi didn't find any contemporary picture of jade seals. So, the studies had to exclusively rely on the historiographical books called 	Cơ mật viện túc trình (Records of the King's Consultation Institute of the Nguyễn dynasty) and Khâm định Đại Nam hội điển sự lệ (History of the cabinet of the Nguyễn dynasty).

During the year Mậu Tý of the reign of Minh Mạng, the man Nguyễn Đăng Khoa from the Quảng Trị Province presented the Emperor with a gift in the form of a jade seal with the inscription "Vạn thọ vô cương" (萬壽無疆).

In 1835 Minh Mạng ordered the creation of a jade seal with the inscription Hoàng Đế chi tỷ (皇帝之璽). It has the carved words "Minh Mạng thập lục niên Ất Mùi tuyên" (Made in Ất Mùi (year of goat), the 16th Minh Mạng year, 1835), and a seal knob featuring two dragons.

A jade seal with the inscription Khâm văn chi tỷ was exclusively used on cultural documents.

The Hoàng Đế chi tỷ seal was exclusively used on the occasion of a general amnesty or the change of reign era (date).

Golden seals 

Golden seals, known in Vietnamese as Kim bửu tỷ (金寶璽), Kim bảo tỷ (金寶璽), or Kim tỷ (金璽), are seals whose inscriptions usually end with "bảo / bửu" (寶).

On mồng 4 tháng 2 năm Minh Mạng thứ tư (15 February 1823) the Hoàng Đế chi bảo (皇帝之寶) was created by order of the Minh Mạng Emperor. According to Dr. Phan Thanh Hải, Director of the Huế Monuments Conservation Centre, the Hoàng Đế chi bảo contains a seal knob in the form of a five-clawed dragon with an erect tail standing in a steady posture. The seal contains the inscriptions "Minh Mạng tứ niên nhị nguyệt sơ tứ nhật cát thời chú tạo" indicating its date of creation and "Thập thành hoàng kim, trọng nhị bách thập lạng cửu tiền nhị phân" indicating that the seal is made of gold and weighs 280 taels (lạng) and 9 mace (tiền), and 2 candareens (phân), or slightly less than 10.5 kilograms making it the heaviest among the seals of the Nguyễn dynasty. The Hoàng Đế chi bảo was considered to be the "top seal" of the Emperor and was only stamped on the most documents on home and foreign affairs.

The Sắc mệnh chi bảo (敕命之寶) has the largest surface of any Nguyễn dynasty period seal at 14 cm x 14 cm, by comparison for the jade seals, the one with the largest surface is 10,5 cm x 10,5 cm. Despite having a larger surface, at 223 taels the Sắc mệnh chi bảo weighs less than the Hoàng Đế chi bảo. This seal is made of 8.3 kg pure gold. Both the Sắc mệnh chi bảo and the Phong Tặng chi bảo were used by the Nguyễn dynasty Emperors to stamp on conferment documents for mandarins in the realm. The Sắc mệnh chi bảo seal was transferred by the Nguyễn dynasty government to the Democratic Republic of Vietnam in 1945 and is now housed in the Vietnam National Museum of History under museum number "LSb.34447".

The golden Trị lịch minh thời chi bảo (治歷明時之寶) seal was used on annual calendars.

During the reign of the Thiệu Trị Emperor a seal with the inscription Thánh Tổ Nhân Hoàng Đế chi bảo was created in the year Thiệu Trị 1 (1841). The creation of this golden seal was ordered two months into his reign to be used in the Thế Miếu shrine to honour his late father. This golden seal has two inscriptions written on its top, one inscription on the left side reads Bát ngũ tuế hoàng kim, trọng nhất bách thập nhất lạng ngũ tiền tứ phân. (English: Gold eight and a half years old with a weight of 111 taels, 5 mace, and 4 candareens; Modern Vietnamese: Vàng 8 tuổi rưỡi, nặng 111 lạng 5 tiền 4 phân). On the right it has the inscription Thiệu Trị nguyên niên tam nguyệt cát nhật phụng chú tạo. (English: Cast on the most auspicious day of the 3rd month of the 1st year of the reign of Thiệu Trị, 1841; Modern Vietnamese: Phụng mệnh đúc vào ngày lành tháng 3 năm Thiệu Trị thứ 1, 1841). This seal features a seal knob in the form of a five-clawed dragon standing with its head upturned and its back arched, further it has a tail with 6 pointed bands.

During the reign of the Thiệu Trị Emperor a golden seal with the inscription Nhân Tuyên Từ Khánh Thái Hoàng Thái hậu chi bảo (仁宣慈慶太皇太后之寶) was created to honour his paternal grandmother Trần Thị Đang during the first year of his reign (1841). Its seal knob is shaped as a five-clawed dragon standing upright with its head upturned, its back arched, and its tail bent with 7 flame-shaped ends. On the left of the seal knob is the text Bát ngũ tuế hoàng kim, trọng cửu thập ngũ lượng thất tiền tứ phân (八五歲皇金重九十五両七錢四分; English: Eight year old gold with a weight of 95 taels, 7 mace, and 4 candareens; Modern Vietnamese: Vàng 8 tuổi rưỡi, nặng 95 lạng 7 tiền 4 phân). While on its right side is the inscription Thiệu Trị nguyên niên tam nguyệt cát nhật phụng chú tạo (紹治元年三月吉日奉鑄造; English: Created on the auspicious day of the third month of the first year of the reign of Thiệu Trị; Modern Vietnamese: Phụng mệnh đúc vào ngày lành tháng 3 năm Thiệu Trị 1, 1841).

Another golden seal for an Empress Dowager was created during the reign of the Thiệu Trị Emperor with the inscription Nhân Hoàng hậu chi bảo (仁皇后之寶). Its seal knob features a five-clawed dragon standing up right with its head held up high and a twisted 6-pointed flame-shaped tail. On the left of the seal knob is the text Bát ngũ tuế kim, trọng bát thập nhị lượng nhị tiền tam phân (八五歲金重八十二両二錢三分; English: Eight year old gold with a weight of 82 taels, 2 mace, and 3 candareens; Modern Vietnamese: Vàng 8 tuổi rưỡi, nặng 82 lạng 2 tiền 3 phân). While on the right it is inscribed with the text Thiệu Trị nguyên niên tứ nguyệt cát nhật phụng chú tạo (紹治元年四月吉日奉鑄造; English: Created on a good day during the 4th month of the first year of the reign of Thiệu Trị; Modern Vietnamese: Đúc vào ngày lành tháng 4 năm Thiệu Trị 1, 1841). This seal was created to honour Hồ Thị Hoa (or the Empress Dowager Tá Thiên).

During the reign of the Thiệu Trị Emperor a seal with the inscription Phúc Tuy công ấn seal was created, this seal featured a seal knob in the form of a four-clawed dragon. On the left of the seal knob is the text Trọng tứ thập ngũ lạng ngũ tiền (English: Weight of 45 taels and 5 mace; Modern Vietnamese: Nặng 45 lạng 5 tiền). While on right it featured the inscription Thiệu Trị tam niên tạo (English: Created in the 3rd year of the reign of Thiệu Trị, 1843; Modern Vietnamese: Đúc vào năm Thiệu Trị thứ 3, 1843). according to the Nguyễn Phúc tộc thế phả this seal was given to Prince Nguyễn Phúc Hồng Nhậm in the year 1843 when he was conferred as Phúc Tuy Công.

During the reign of the Thiệu Trị Emperor a golden seal with the inscription Đại Nam hiệp kỷ lịch chi bảo (大南協紀曆之寶), this seal has a five-clawed dragon-shaped seal knob that is similar in design to the ones found on the Minh Mạng period Khâm văn chi tỷ, Duệ vũ chi tỷ and Trị lịch minh thời chi bảo seals. On its handle it features two inscriptions, one the left is written Thập tuế hoàng kim, trọng nhất bách nhị thập ngũ lạng ngũ tiền tứ phân (English: Ten year old gold with a weight of 125 taels, 5 mace, and 4 candareens; Modern Vietnamese: Vàng 10 tuổi, nặng 125 lạng 5 tiền 4 phân). While on its left it is inscribed with the text Thiệu Trị thất niên thập nguyệt cát nhật tạo (English: Cast on the auspicious day of the 10th month of 7th year of the reign of Thiệu Trị; Modern Vietnamese: Đúc vào ngày lành tháng 10 năm Thiệu trị thứ 7, 1847). This seal superseded the Trị lịch minh thời chi bảo for usage on the official calendars of the Nguyễn dynasty.

Ivory seals 

During the years 1846–1847, The Thiệu Trị Emperor ordered the creation of an ivory seal. This seal has a dragon-shaped seal knob, a round face (as opposed to most square seals), and a diameter of 10.8 centimeters. Its inscription is carved in the words meaning "As a record for the enjoyment of the Emperor and the imperial family".

Under Emperor Khải Định an ivory seal was created that was ellipse in shape and had the inscription Khải Định thần khuê (啟定宸奎) written in Traditional Chinese characters as opposed to seal script.

Meteorite seals 

During the years reign of Đồng Khánh a meteorite seal (ấn làm từ thiên thạch) was specifically made for him. In order to show friendship between France and Emperor Đồng Khánh, the French government commissioned a special gift as Stanislas-Étienne Meunier, geologist, mineralogist, and scientific journalist, wrote: "For the Son of Heaven like Đồng Khánh, nothing is better than giving him a treasure from heaven. So, I ask our government to try to find a meteorite, then carve it and turn it into a precious seal." to the President of France who accepted his proposal and Stanislas-Étienne Meunier immediately began looking for the perfect meteorite to make the treasure.

Stanislas-Étienne Meunier had to go everywhere to find a satisfactory meteorite, in the end he found it in the city of Vienna, Austria-Hungary, where he bought a rock that fell to the earth on 30 January 1868 near Pułtusk, Vistula Land, Russia (present-day Pułtusk, Mazovia, Poland). Stanislas-Étienne Meunier described the meteorite as not being cracked and having a beautiful appearance, and a suitable size. Meunier was happy with the specimen and brought it back to the jeweler to manufacture.

The seal itself is made of pure gold and is engraved with words "Le gouvernement de la République Française à S. M. Dong-Khanh, roi d'Annam" (English: The government of the French Republic, his royal highness Đồng Khánh, King of Annam; Vietnamese: Chính phủ cộng hoà Pháp tặng vua Đồng Khánh, quốc vương xứ An Nam) in French.

According to the book Đồng Khánh chính yếu the seal was presented to Đồng Khánh in December 1887. Upon receiving the seal Đồng Khánh thanked the French government and issued a statement to the people that read:

Which translated into English means "Resident-superior Séraphin Hector, now stationed in the imperial capital city, presented a gift in the form of a jade seal made by the noble servants of the court. The court created, on engraved with four words "The Court of Establishment", said that it was given by the Emperor of Great(er) France. It was a rock which descended upon the earth by heavenly goodness, and Great(er) France found the rock and made a seal out of it. It is truly a most precious and rare treasure, most very difficult to acquire. The French now brought it as a gift so that from now on, if there is something that needs to be reported to the government of Great(er) France, then I shall use this special seal to make news."

Silver seals 

During its existence the Nguyễn dynasty created a number of silver seals (Ấn đúc bằng bạc). According to the book Nguyễn Phúc tộc thế phả prince Nguyễn Phúc Miên Tông was sent to study during the reign of his father in the year of the Tiger (năm Canh Dần, 1830). There he was given the nickname Trường Khánh công. In the same year Emperor Minh Mạng (Minh Mệnh) gave Nguyễn Phúc Miên Tông the gift of a gold-plated silver seal, with a vertical dragon-shaped seal knob, this dragon was depicted with a raised head, a curved back, a bent tail, and four-claws. The back of the seal is engraved with 2 lines of Chinese characters, indicating that the seal weighs 44 ounces, 9, 4 centimeters and notes the date of its creation. The inscription on this silver seal is Trường Khánh công ấn.

During the reign of the Thiệu Trị Emperor a silver seal with the inscription Phúc Tuy quan phòng was created. Its seal knob is shaped as a Kỳ lân with an upturned head, arched back, bent tail, and 4 loose legs. It was cast during the 2nd year of Thiệu Trị or the year of the Ox (Năm Tân Sửu, 1841). This seal was gifted to Prince Nguyễn Phúc Hồng Nhậm in the year 1843.

Bronze seals 

Bronze seals, known in Vietnamese as Ấn triện bằng đồng (印篆評銅), were seals generally reserved for people of a lower status than the imperial family, but due to the financial difficulties Đại Nam was in due to war reparations imposed by the French and Spanish, the Tự Đức Emperor confiscated gold seals given to the princes and princesses of the Imperial family and replaced them with identical bronze seals. The order the Tự Đức Emperor made read as: "All kinds of ngân sách, ấn (seals), quan, and quan phòng of princes and princesses must be returned and melted down into bars for use. But according to the original pattern be cast into bronze again for convenience and everlasting storage." (Các loại ngân sách, ấn, quan, quan phòng của các hoàng thân, công chúa phải nộp và nấu chảy thành thỏi để dùng. Nhưng theo mẫu đổi đúc lại bằng đồng để tiện cho đời đời lưu giữ). After the year 1869 almost all seals of the imperial court (excluding the ones for the Emperor and some select princes) were primarily made of bronze.

Bronze seals were cast for many different types of government offices and functions such as mandarins, other bureaucrats, administrative divisions, medals, signatures, Etc. and the knobs of bronze seals may be decorated with a Chinese "unicorn", a Chinese guardian lion, a straight shape, or a ring shape among others. These seal knobs had different levels of heights and weights, but it was absolutely impossible for a bronze seal to have a dragon-shaped seal knob as these were only reserved for seals of more precious materials.

List of imperial seals of the Nguyễn dynasty

Emperors 

List of lordly and royal seals of the Nguyễn lords and imperial seals of the Nguyễn dynasty:

Empress-Consorts and the imperial family

Imperial seals on documents

List of office seals of the Nguyễn dynasty government

Imperial government ministries and agencies

Imperial cabinets

Ministries (Bộ)

Viện

Six Courts (Lục tự)

Other imperial government agencies

Provincial administration

Tổng Trấn and Kinh lược sứ

Tổng đốc and Phủ doãn

Tuần phủ

Protectorates, special regions, and dependencies

French Residents 

This is a list of seals of the Vietnamese-style seals used on Classical Chinese language documents of the French Residents appointed to oversee the provincial administrations of the provinces of the French protectorates of Annam and Tonkin alongside indigenous mandarins, it does not include the French-style seals used on French language documents.

Military seals

Imperial Guards

Five Armies

Navy

Police seals

Tax-related seals

Other government seals

Government office seals on documents

List of seals of the Nguyễn dynasty period nobility

Imperial ranks

Dukes

Non-imperial ranks

Barons

Shapes of seals

Seals in the Socialist Republic of Vietnam 

In modern Vietnam square seals with seal script characters no longer enjoy official use, instead, according to state regulations, each company or enterprise should have its own round seal. These seals are round in shape and must contain both the name and registration number of the organisation. According to the Enterprise Law 2014 (Luật doanh nghiệp năm 2014) in order to create more favourable conditions for Vietnamese businesses, when registering the seal sample, businesses are no longer required to register with the police. Instead, the company can engrave the seal sample by itself and send the seal sample to the business registration office. When the enterprise uses a new seal or changes the company's seal information, the company is required to register the new company seal sample with the government. In 2021 an official seal typically costs đ350.000 a piece.

The Hoan phụng ngũ đại đồng đường nhất thống Thiệu Trị chi bảo (歡奉五大同堂一統紹治之寶) seal created during the reign of the  Tự Đức Emperor has been described as "one of the earliest Vietnamese round seals". Later, a number of other round and ellipse-shaped imperial seals were created by the Nguyễn Empire.

Government seals in the Socialist Republic of Vietnam today are usually circular in shape, and have the emblem of Vietnam in the centre of the circle. The name of the governmental institution is arranged around the national emblem in a semicircle.

The study of historical seals in modern Vietnam 

There is a scholarly discipline which specialises in the study of seals printed on various types of documents produced by the various dynasties in Vietnamese history. According to Professor Hà Văn Tấn, a scholar specialised in this field, the seals on ancient documents usually had 3 specific functions: ensuring the authenticity of the document, asserting the ownership of the text, and determining the document's date of signing.

Studies on the Nguyễn dynasty's imperial archives have progressed the works of different areas of scholarship including administration studies, document studies, family annals studies, and seal studies. As the imperial archives show a deep insight into the evolution of the documents (including the seals and how they were used) over the course of the Nguyễn dynasty period.

In 2013 Hà Văn Huề, Nguyễn Thị Thu Hường, Đoàn Thị Thu Thuỷ, and Associate Professor Nguyễn Công Việt published a book entitled Ấn chương trên Châu bản triều Nguyễn to introduce to the public and researchers the types of seals used by the government of the Nguyễn dynasty and its agencies at every level. Thereby, partly providing more information for research in the fields of Hán-Nôm Studies, Literature, Archives, Textology, Historianism, Etc.

See also 
 Banknote seal (China)
 Emblem of Vietnam
 Heirloom Seal of the Realm
 National Seals of the Republic of China
 Seal of the People’s Government of the People’s Republic of China
 Privy Seal of Japan
 State Seal of Japan
 Seal of South Korea
 Seal cutting (art)
 Seal engraving (art)

Notes

References

Sources 

 Nguyễn Công Việt - Ấn Chương Việt Nam (NXB Khoa Học Xã Hội 2005), 550 pages. (in Vietnamese).
 ThS. Hà Văn Huề, ThS. Nguyễn Thị Thu Hường, ThS. Đoàn Thị Thu Thuỷ, PGS.TS Nguyễn Công Việt - Ấn chương trên Châu bản triều Nguyễn. - Năm xuất bản : 2013 Nhà xuất bản : (NXB Hà Nội Cuốn sách). (in Vietnamese).

External links 

 

Symbols of Nguyen dynasty
Vietnamese heraldry
Nguyễn dynasty
Regalia